Euptera pluto, the Pluto euptera, is a butterfly in the family Nymphalidae. It is found in Liberia, Togo, Nigeria, Cameroon, Gabon, the Republic of the Congo, the Central African Republic, the Democratic Republic of the Congo, Uganda and Zambia.

The larvae feed on Englerophytum species.

Subspecies
Euptera pluto pluto (southern Nigeria, Cameroon, Gabon, Congo, Central African Republic, northern Democratic Republic of the Congo) 
Euptera pluto occidentalis Chovet, 1998 (Liberia, Togo)
Euptera pluto primitiva Hancock, 1984 (Uganda: Katera, Democratic Republic of the Congo: south-east to Lualaba, north-western Zambia)

References

Butterflies described in 1873
Euptera
Butterflies of Africa
Taxa named by Christopher Ward (entomologist)